Alsbach mey refer to the following places in Germany:

Alsbach, Westerwaldkreis, in the Westerwaldkreis district, Rhineland-Palatinate
Alsbach-Hähnlein, in the Darmstadt-Dieburg district, Hesse
Scheibe-Alsbach, a municipality in the Sonneberg district, Thuringia